This is a list of the Romania national football team results from 1940 to 1959.

1940

1941

1942

1943

1945

1946

1947

1948

1949

1950

1951

1952

1953

1954

1955

1956

1957

1958

1959

References

All details are sourced to the match reports cited, unless otherwise specified:

External links
Romanian Football Federation
Matches of Romania 
RSSSF archive of results 1922–2006
FIFA.com - Romania: Fixtures and Results
World Referee - Matches featuring Romania
EU-Football - international football match results of Romania 1922-present

Romania national football team results